Air Force blue colours are a variety of colours that are mostly various tones of the colour azure, the purest tones of which are identified as being the colour of the sky on a clear day.

Some air force blue colours, notably the air force blue colour used by the United States Air Force and the colour used by the US Air Force Academy, may look like they are tones of blue instead of azure.  However, they are actually dark tones of azure, not blue.

These air force blue colours are used by these various air forces for colour identification.

RAF blue

Air Force blue, more specifically Air Force blue (RAF) or RAF blue, is a medium shade of the colour azure. The shade derives from the light blue uniforms issued to the newly formed British Royal Air Force in 1920, which were influential in the design of the uniforms of some other air forces around the world. Similar shades are still used in Royal Air Force uniforms and the Royal Air Force Ensign.

The choice of blue uniforms for the RAF was the result of a surplus of inexpensive medium sky blue coloured herringbone twill in the United Kingdom, which had been intended for use in the uniforms of Czarist Russian imperial cavalrymen before the Russian Revolution occurred.

The field of the RAF ensign is specified as "NATO stock no.8305-99-130-4578, Pantone 549 C."

The shade of the colour that is shown in the colour info-box is the shade of air force blue used by the Royal Air Force. Some other air forces, notably those of the Commonwealth of Nations, use shades that closely resemble the shade of air force blue shown above, including the Royal Canadian Air Force, the Royal Australian Air Force, and the Royal New Zealand Air Force.

US Air Force blue

Displayed at right is the colour Air Force blue (USAF).

US Air Force blue is designated as the colour Pantone 287.

USAFA blue

Displayed at right is the colour US Air Force Academy blue.

The US Air Force Academy uses a particular shade of azure, subtly different from US Air Force blue, in its sporting and other insignia, described as USAFA blue in official documentation.

Other variations
Other air forces of other nations of the Commonwealth of Nations, such as the Indian Air Force, the Pakistani Air Force and the South African Air Force, or other air forces of other nations that are not in the Commonwealth, such as  the French Air Force, the German Air Force, the Russian Air Force, the People's Republic of China Air Force, the Japanese Air Force, the Islamic Republic of Iran Air Force, the Egyptian Air Force and the Israeli Air Force, for example, use a wide variety of brighter, lighter, or darker tones of blue.

Related colours

Sky blue

Displayed at right is the web colour sky blue.

The first recorded use of sky blue as a colour name in English was in 1728 in the Cyclopædia of Ephraim Chambers.

Aero

Displayed at right is the colour aero.

The first recorded use of aero as a colour name in English was in 1920.

Wild blue yonder

Displayed at right is the colour wild blue yonder.

This Crayola colour was formulated in 2003. It is intended to represent the colour of the sky on a cloudy, stormy day.

Air superiority blue/PRU blue

At right is displayed the colour air superiority blue/PRU Blue.

Photographic Reconnaissance Unit (PRU) Blue was devised by Sidney Cotton for the RAF during WW II as a low visibility camouflage colour for its high-flying Supermarine Spitfire and de Havilland Mosquito reconnaissance aircraft.

As "air superiority blue" it was then adopted by the US Army Air Forces and was added as one of the colours when the Federal Standard 595 colour list was set up in 1956. This colour is used as camouflage by being painted on the bottom sides of reconnaissance aircraft to make them less visible from the ground.  

The source of this colour is Federal Standard 595, a U.S. Federal Government standard set up in 1956 for paint colours, which is mostly used by military contractors and also in engineering. 'Air superiority blue' is designated as Federal Standard 595 colour #FS 15450. PRU Blue is British Standards BS636

Blue yonder

The colour blue yonder is displayed at right.

The source of this colour is the "Pantone Textile Paper eXtended (TPX)" colour list, colour #18-3937 TPX—Blue Yonder.

See also
List of colours
Navy blue

Notes

References

Shades of azure
Shades of blue